The 1985 South Australian state election was held on 7 December 1985.

Retiring Members

Labor
Max Brown MHA (Whyalla)
George Whitten MHA (Price)
Jack Wright MHA (Adelaide)
Cec Creedon MLC

Liberal
Allan Rodda MHA (Victoria)
Ren DeGaris MLC

Democrats
Lance Milne MLC

House of Assembly
Sitting members are shown in bold text. Successful candidates are highlighted in the relevant colour. Where there is possible confusion, an asterisk (*) is also used.

Legislative Council
Sitting members are shown in bold text. Tickets that elected at least one MLC are highlighted in the relevant colour. Successful candidates are identified by an asterisk (*). Eleven seats were up for election. Labor were defending five seats. The Liberals were defending five seats. The Democrats were defending one seat.

References

Candidates for South Australian state elections
1985 elections in Australia
1980s in South Australia